John Metcalf (born 25 February 1934) is a British hurdler. Metcalf competed in the men's 400 metres hurdles at the 1960 Summer Olympics. He represented England in the 440 yards hurdles at the 1958 British Empire and Commonwealth Games in Cardiff, Wales.

References

External links
 

1934 births
Living people
Athletes (track and field) at the 1960 Summer Olympics
British male hurdlers
Olympic athletes of Great Britain
Place of birth missing (living people)
Athletes (track and field) at the 1958 British Empire and Commonwealth Games
Commonwealth Games competitors for England